The original dance (OD) was one of the programs performed by figure skaters in ice dance competitions, in which the ice dancers skated "a dance of their own creation to dance music they have selected for the designated rhythm(s)". It was normally the second of three programs in the competition, sandwiched between the compulsory dance (CD) and the free dance (FD). The rhythm(s) and type of music required for the OD changed every season, and were selected by the International Skating Union (ISU) before the start of the season. The ice dancers were free to choose their own music and choreography (within the specified constraints) and to create their own routines. They were judged on a set of required criteria, including skating skills and how well they interpreted the music and the rhythm.

The ISU voted in 2010 to discontinue the OD, along with the CD, and to introduce the short dance (SD) as a replacement. Accordingly, after the 2009–2010 season, the ice dance competition structure was changed and the original dance was removed from all ISU junior and senior level competitions.

History

The original dance (OD) was added to ice dance competitions in 1967, when it became a replacement for one of the two compulsory dances. It was previously called the "original set pattern dance" (OSPD), but its name was simplified to the "original dance" in 1990. The OD remained the second competition segment, after the compulsory dance (CD) and before the free dance (FD), until the competition structure was changed prior to the 2010–2011 season. In the late 1920s, an original dance event was skated at the U.S. Figure Skating Championships, replacing the fourteenstep, one of the oldest dances in the sport, with the stipulation that it had to be skated to a fox trot.

The highest recorded OD score is 70.27 points, which was achieved by Canadian ice dancers Tessa Virtue and Scott Moir at the 2010 World Championships.

Requirements

Ice dancers were able to select their own music for the OD and create an "original" routine, but they were required to use a set rhythm and type of music, which changed every season (as did the CD) and were chosen beforehand by the ISU. The OD needed to reflect the character of the music's rhythm and "be translated to the ice by demonstrating technical skill in steps and movements along with flow and the use of edges".

The five program components included in the OD were: skating skills; footwork and movement (particularly the transitions linking them); performance and/or execution of the program; choreography and composition of the program; and the interpretation and timing of the music. The judges also considered how well the competitors performed certain elements in the OD, such as dance spins, lifts, synchronized twizzles, and step sequences.

During the OD, apart from the mandatory step sequences, ice dancers were only permitted to cross the long axis of the ice surface once at each end of the rink, within 20 meters of the barrier. All rotations, turns, steps, and changes of hold were allowed, as long as they followed the music's rhythm. Interpretation of the rhythm was considered to be the most important aspect of the OD so, along with the timing, this was scored the highest. The OD had a time limit of two minutes and was worth 30% of the total score.

Elimination from competition format

In 2010, the ISU voted to eliminate both the CD and the OD, and to restructure ice dance competitions to include a new short dance (SD) segment alongside the existing FD segment. Despite the anticipated change, the ISU published their OD rhythm/music choices for both junior and senior ice dance teams for the 2010–2011 season, "rhythms and dances of the 1950s, 1960s or 1970s". The OD was included in competitions for the last time in the 2009–2010 season, when the choice of rhythm/music for both juniors and seniors was "folk/country" or "any type of folk/country dance music or typical dance of the country".

List of original dance rhythms by season
The following is a list of senior level original dance rhythms.

References

Works cited 
 Hines, James R. (2011). Historical Dictionary of Figure Skating. Lanham, Maryland: Scarecrow Press. .
 U.S. Figure Skating (2009). "The 2010 Official U.S. Figure Skating Rulebook" (2010 Rulebook). Archived from the original on 18 July 2018. Colorado Springs, Colorado. Retrieved 8 September 2022.

Figure skating
Ice dance